The 1967–68 NCAA College Division men's ice hockey season began in November 1967 and concluded in March of the following year. This was the 4th season of second-tier college ice hockey.

Four of the five members of the Worcester Collegiate Hockey League joined ECAC 2 with only Worcester Polytechnic Institute remaining outside. Because the five schools already held a tournament between themselves at season's end, none of the teams qualified for the ECAC 2 Tournament. This arrangement held until 1972 by which time two teams had left the conference and continuing with three members was not viable.

The NAIA began holding a national tournament in 1968. With ECAC 2 already holding a tournament for the vast majority of eastern schools, the NAIA received most of their bids from western schools with a few exceptions (Boston State and Salem State). The NAIA tournament would be the only national championship for non-Division I programs until the NCAA started holding the Division II Championship in 1978, after which the NAIA division declined until it was dropped as a sponsored sport in 1984.

Regular season

Season tournaments

Standings

See also
 1967–68 NCAA University Division men's ice hockey season

References

External links

 
NCAA